World Congress of Finno-Ugric Peoples is the representative forum of Finno-Ugric and Samoyedic people. The forum is not related to any government or political party. The goals of the forum is to "develop and protect national identity, cultures and languages of Finno-Ugric peoples, to promote cooperation between Finno-Ugric peoples, to discuss topical issues and to identify solutions, and to realise the right of Finno-Ugric peoples to self-determination in accordance with international norms and principles".

Forums
Locations and dates of the forums:
 I forum. Syktyvkar, Komi Republic, Russia. 1–3 December 1992
 II forum. Budapest, Hungary. 17–19 August 1996
 III forum. Helsinki, Finland. 10–13 December 2000
 IV forum. Tallinn, Estonia. 15–19 August 2004
 V forum. Khanty-Mansiisk, Russia. 27–30 June 2008
 VI forum. Siofok, Hungary. 5–7 September 2012
 VII forum. Lahti, Finland. 15–17 June 2016
 VIII forum. Tartu, Estonia. 16-18 June 2021

References

External links

 

Congresses
Finno-Ugric peoples